Pheung Kya-shin (5 February 1931 – 16 February 2022) was the chairman of the Kokang Special Region in Myanmar (Burma) and the leader of the Myanmar National Democratic Alliance Army (MNDAA).

Biography
Pheung is of Chinese descent, and was born near Kokang's Red Rock River (红石头河) in 1931. He was the oldest of seven children. In 1949 he studied military affairs under Sao Edward Yang Kyein Tsai, the saopha of Kokang at that time, and became the captain of Yang's defense force, where he remained until Yang's was deposed by the Myanmar Armed Forces (the military junta ruling Burma) in 1965. Later that year he established the Kokang People's Revolutionary Army and began leading a small group of youth in guerilla warfare against the Myanmar Armed Forces, at which time his younger brother Pheung Kya-fu also became a military leader.

In April 1969, Kokang province was established with Pheung as its leader. For 20 years he controlled Kokang as a member of the Communist Party of Burma (CPB). In 1989, however, the CPB split up and Pheung established his own army, the Myanmar National Democratic Alliance Army, with which he mutinied and captured the city of Mong Ko. After this he signed a cease-fire with the military junta, which allowed the Kokang army to retain their weapons, and established an autonomous Kokang region as the "First Special Region" of Myanmar.

Pheung has played a large role in drug production in Burma. According to Bertil Lintner, he established the first heroin factory in Kokang during the 1970s and continued trafficking heroin for at least 20 years. In 1990, he legalized opium planting in Kokang. Later, however, he said he opposed the drug trade: in a 1999 talk to journalists and narcotics experts he said he was working on "purging the area of opium", and that he had been trying to end the opium trade for 10 years. The Kokang government declared the region "drug-free" in 2003. The central government and narcotics experts, however, still suspect the region of being involved in the drug trade.

The cease-fire with the military junta was broken in August 2009 after the government sent troops to conduct a drug raid on a factory suspected of being a drug front, and on Pheung's own house. At the same time, Pheung was challenged from within the army, as his deputy Bai Suocheng and others were said to have become loyal to the junta. The confrontation with junta troops eventually led to violent conflict (the Kokang incident); Pheung himself was driven out by his competitors from within the army and is rumored to have fled, after a warrant was issued for his arrest.

He reappeared in an interview with the Chinese state newspaper Global Times in December 2014. He pledged to retake control of Kokang from the Myanmar Army. Armed clashes erupted in February 2015 between his troops and the Myanmar Army, with initial heavy casualties on the Burmese side.

Pheung was known to have close ties to Asia World's Lo Hsing Han, a former opium kingpin, and his son Steven Law (Tun Myint Naing), and was believed to have investments in Singapore through them.

He died on 16 February 2022, at the age of 91.

Notes

References

1931 births
2022 deaths
Burmese communists
Burmese drug traffickers
Burmese people of Chinese descent
Burmese politicians of Chinese descent
People from Shan State
Burmese warlords